Dan Doyle or Danny Doyle may refer to:

Sports
 Dan Doyle (footballer) (1864–1918), Scottish footballer
 Danny Doyle (baseball) (1917–2004), American baseball player
 Danny Doyle (basketball) (born 1940), former American professional basketball player
 Dan Doyle (basketball) (fl. 1970s–2010s), Executive Director of the Institute for International Sport

Other
 Danny Doyle (singer) (1940–2019), Irish folk singer
 Dan Doyle (record producer) (fl. 1970s–2000s), American record producer
 Dan Doyle (politician) (fl. 2000s), former Republican state legislator and attorney from the U.S. state of Oregon
 DJ Doyle (fl. 2010s), television writer

See also
Daniel Boyle (disambiguation)